Francesco Passaro (born 7 January 2001) is an Italian tennis player.

Passaro has a career high ATP singles ranking of world No. 108 on 13 February 2023 and doubles ranking of world No. 293 on 26 September 2022.

Career
Passaro made his ATP main draw debut at the 2021 Emilia-Romagna Open after receiving a wildcard for the doubles main draw. 

He played his first ATP Challenger Tour final at the 2022 Sanremo Challenger and he was defeated in three sets by the world No. 91 Holger Rune.
He won his first Challenger in July 2022 in Trieste, Italy becoming the 20th #NextGenATP winner in 2022. As a result he reached a new career-high in the top 150 of world No. 144 on 25 July 2022.

He qualified for the 2022 Next Generation ATP Finals.

Challenger and World Tennis Tour Finals

Singles: 10 (4 titles, 6 runner-ups)

Doubles: 6 (3–3)

References

External links

2001 births
Living people
Italian male tennis players
Mediterranean Games gold medalists for Italy
Competitors at the 2022 Mediterranean Games
Mediterranean Games medalists in tennis
Sportspeople from Perugia
21st-century Italian people